Qeshlaq-e Owrtadagh-e Tapaduq (also Romanized as Qeshlāq-e Owrtādāgh-e Tāpadūq) is a village in Qeshlaq-e Jonubi Rural District, Qeshlaq Dasht District, Bileh Savar County, Ardabil Province, Iran. At the 2006 census, its population was 31, in 8 families.

References 

Towns and villages in Bileh Savar County